John D'Arcy Coulson (February 17, 1908 – April 13, 1996) was a Canadian professional ice hockey defenceman who played one season in the National Hockey League for the Philadelphia Quakers, in 1930–31. The rest of his career, which lasted from 1927 to 1931, and then from 1934 to 1036, was mainly spent in the amateur Ottawa City Hockey League.

He was born in Sudbury, Ontario, he first played for the Ottawa Shamrocks of the OCHL in 1927. He played for the Quakers in the 1930–31 season, scoring no goals in the NHL but ranking third in the league in penalty minutes with 103.

After leaving hockey, Coulson, whose father owned hotels in Sudbury, Ottawa and Hawkesbury and a golf club in Aylmer, Quebec, joined the family business. The hotel in Sudbury, although no longer owned by the Coulson family, is still named the Coulson Hotel.

Career statistics

Regular season and playoffs

External links
 
 

1908 births
1996 deaths
Canadian ice hockey defencemen
Ice hockey people from Ontario
Philadelphia Quakers (NHL) players
Sportspeople from Greater Sudbury